Chorizanthe procumbens is a species of flowering plant in the buckwheat family known by the common name prostrate spineflower. It is native to California and Baja California, where it grows in scrub and chaparral habitat. It is variable in appearance, up to 25 centimeters long or much shorter, usually growing prostrate along the ground. It is often yellowish green in color but there are grayish and reddish forms. The inflorescence is a cluster of flowers with each minute white or yellow flower surrounded by spine-tipped bracts.

External links
Jepson Manual Treatment
Photo gallery

procumbens
Flora of California
Flora of Baja California
Natural history of the California chaparral and woodlands
Natural history of the Peninsular Ranges
Natural history of the Transverse Ranges
Taxa named by Thomas Nuttall
Flora without expected TNC conservation status